The 2010–11 CEV Challenge Cup was the 31st edition of the European Challenge Cup volleyball club tournament, the former CEV Cup.

The Italian club Lube Banca Marche Macerata beat the Turkish club Arkas Izmir in the final and achieved its fourth CEV Challenge Cup trophy.

Final phase

Semi-finals

|}

First leg

|}

Second leg

|}

Final

|}

First leg

|}

Second leg

|}

Final standing

References

External links
 Official site

CEV Challenge Cup
2010 in volleyball
2011 in volleyball